Taikang County, formerly known as Yangjia County or Yangxia County, is a county in the north of Zhoukou prefecture-level city, in the east of Henan province, China. It is divided into 23 townships and 766 villages. The county is home to 1.43 million Han Chinese and 25,000 Hui, with a population density of 581 people per kilometre squared.

History
The administrative area of Taikang was originally known as "Yangxia County"; its name was derived from Xia dynasty king Tai Kang. The character "" is normally pronounced as  but in Central Plains Mandarin is pronounced . As a major thoroughfare, the county has been historically important. It was the hometown of Wu Guang, one of the peasant leaders of the rebellion against the Qin dynasty. It was also the ancestral hometown of the Xie and Yuan surnames; it consequently was the birthplace of several famous Xie clan members such as Xie Daoyun, Xie Hui, Xie Lingyun, Xie Tiao, and others. Following the start of the chaotic Sixteen Kingdoms period, Yangxia County initially remained part of the areas held by the Eastern Jin, but was later conquered by the Former Qin. In course of the latter's decline, the county was occupied by the Northern Wei that held it until 446. It was then captured by the Liu Song dynasty, but reconquered by the Northern Wei in 488. Toward the end of the Northern and Southern dynasties period, Yangxia County fell to the Sui dynasty, which changed its name to "Taikang County" in 587.

In 884, the Tang army under Li Keyong defeated the rebel army of Shang Rang at Taikang.

By time of the Ming dynasty, Taikang had grown rich as trade center and market town, and was widely nicknamed "Silver Taikang". Due to this wealth, however, the town was repeatedly sacked in times of political unrest. It was plundered by the Shun rebel army of Li Zicheng in 1644 during the fall of the Ming dynasty. In course of the Nian Rebellion, 
Taikang was plundered by insurgents four times, namely in 1852, 1856, 1861, and 1863. After the Xinhai Revolution's outbreak, the Yellow Sand Society and the Cha Tianhua bandit group raided the town in 1911. In the following years, Taikang's economic importance declined due to the construction of railways in the region, but it was still the target of rampaging bandits and soldiers in the Warlord Era and Nanjing decade, with raids occurring in October 1923, December 1924, November 1925, January as well as June 1926, March 1927, March 1928, winter 1930, and January 1932.

Today, Taikang is a primarily agrarian county, with some light industry. The county is famous for its production of cotton.

Administrative divisions
As 2012, this county is divided to 11 towns and 12 townships.
Towns

Townships

Climate

Notable people
 Xie Daoyun, renown Eastern Jin poet
 Xie Fei (441–507), high-ranking official who served under the Liu Song dynasty, Southern Qi, and Liang dynasty
 Xie Hongwei (392–433), high-ranking official under the Liu Song dynasty
 Xie Hui, high-ranking official and regent under the Liu Song dynasty
 Xie Lingyun, important Six Dynasties poet
 Xie Shang (308–337), high-ranking official under the Eastern Jin dynasty
 Xie Tiao, major Yongming poet
 Xie Zhuang (421–466), high-ranking official under the Liu Song dynasty

References

Bibliography

External links
Official website of Taikang County Government

Taikang County
County-level divisions of Henan
Zhoukou